A men's golf tournament was held at the 1900 Summer Olympics. It was the first of the three times such a tournament would be featured. There were 12 competitors from 4 nations. The event was won by Charles Sands of the United States. Great Britain took the next two spots, with Walter Rutherford finishing one stroke behind Sands and David Robertson in third at 8 strokes behind Sands.

Background

In the preparation for the 1900 Games, a Special Advisory Committee led by Jacques de Pourtalès (a cousin of Hermann de Pourtalès, who along with his wife Hélène de Pourtalès won a gold medal in sailing in 1900) proposed a golf tournament be included given that the sport was popular in many countries (though not well known in France). The result was the first Olympic golf tournament, held at the Compiègne golf club. Divisions for both men and women, as well as a men's handicap division (not considered Olympic) were set.

Golf would be held again in 1904. In 1908, a dispute among the host nation's golfers resulted in all the British competitors boycotting and the event being cancelled. The sport would not be held again at the Olympics until 2016.

Competition format

The men's event consisted of a 36-hole stroke play tournament. The scores for each of the 36 holes were summed to give a total for each player, with the lowest score winning. In the event of a tie, a replayed hole would be used.

Schedule

Results

The men played two rounds (36 holes), summing the scores. The entire competition was held on 2 October.

References

Sources
 International Olympic Committee medal winners database
 
 

Golf at the 1900 Summer Olympics
Men's events at the 1900 Summer Olympics